Zheng Lun (Chinese: 鄭倫; Pinyin: Zhèng Lún) is a character featured within the famed classic Chinese novel Fengshen Yanyi.

Zheng Lun was originally the head student under Duè Zhenrèn (度厄真人) of the Western Kunlun Mountains. Zheng Lun would be destined to assist in the founding of the new dynasty and one day attain the rank of God. For years upon end, Zheng Lun would train his legendary black crow troops and attain perfection with his evil taming bars. At one point in time, Zheng Lun would head down from the Kunlun Mountains to serve as a loyal sword of Su Hu, the head of Ji province. 

At one point within the coalition against Su Hu, Zheng Lun would personally take action against the new enemy, Chong Heihu, with the words "My lord! I will capture Chong Heihu for you! Or I will present you with my head before all these generals." So saying, Zheng Lun would mount his golden-eyed beast, grab hold of his two bars, and set forth with his great army of three thousand black crow troops. 

In appearance before Chong Heihu, it could easily be seen that Zheng Lun's hair was like that of golden needles and his face was like that of a purple plum. Immediately, Zheng Lun's great taming bars would parry off against Chong's duel golden axes and thus a great battle ensued between the two renowned warriors. Soon enough, Zheng would recognize the large red gourd atop Chong's back and instantly realize that it is his source for his magic. Thus, Zheng Lun would shoot two large jets from both of his nostrils to suck up Chong's spirit and soul. Once this process was completed, Zheng Lun returned to Ji province with the unconscious Chong as prisoner. Following this point, Zheng Lun would not appear again for quite some time.

Zheng Lun and Chen Qi (陳奇) was appointed as the deity of Heng Ha Erjiang (哼哈二將) in the end.

Notes

References
 Investiture of the Gods chapter 3 pages 35 - 37

Chinese gods
Investiture of the Gods characters